A number of motor vessels have been named Ulysses:

 , which was wrecked in 1887, Gulf of Suez
, the former Empire Creek, which was wrecked in 1979
, a RO-RO ferry used by Irish Ferries since 2001
, a container ship, IMO 9364203

See also
, for Royal Navy vessels
, for steamships named Ulysses
, for United States Navy vessels
 Ulysses (disambiguation)

References

Ship names